Events in the year 1690 in Norway.

Incumbents
Monarch: Christian V

Events
10 October – Shipwreck off Jæren. Among the deaths were Danish nobleman Laurids Lindenov and his wife.

Arts and literature

Births

28 October – Peter Tordenskjold, nobleman and naval flag officer (d.1720).

Deaths
10 October – Laurids Lindenov, amtmann of Bergenhus amt (born in the 1640s).

See also

References